The Ice Harvest is a 2005 American neo-noir black comedy film directed by Harold Ramis, written by Richard Russo and Robert Benton, based on the 2000 novel of the same name by Scott Phillips and starring John Cusack, Billy Bob Thornton, and Connie Nielsen, with Randy Quaid and Oliver Platt in supporting roles. It was distributed by Focus Features, and it was released on VHS and DVD on February 28, 2006, making it the last Focus Features film released on VHS format. The Ice Harvest grossed $10.2 million worldwide.

Plot
On Christmas Eve in Wichita, Kansas, mob lawyer Charlie Arglist and pornographer Vic Cavanaugh prepare to leave town after stealing $2 million from their boss, mobster Bill Guerrard. However, icy roads means their getaway is postponed. Vic holds the cash when they split up, biding their time until the roads clear.

Charlie visits Sweet Cage, a local strip-club owned by Vic and run by Renata Crest, a woman whom Charlie has long lusted after. She quickly deduces he is hiding something. Charlie hints at the money, and she suggests they run away together. Taking advantage of the perceived situation, Renata asks Charlie to steal an incriminating photo of herself and a local politician from Vic.

After talking to his friend Sidney, a bartender and bouncer at Sweet Cage, Charlie goes to another strip club owned by Vic, the Tease-O-Rama, and takes the photo from a safe. Before he can leave, Roy Gelles, one of Guerrard's enforcers, arrives looking for Charlie. Charlie hides in the men's restroom as Gelles enters. Roy reads aloud a limerick written in red sharpie on the wall above the urinal, "As Wichita falls, so falls Wichita Falls". After evading Gelles, Charlie goes to a local restaurant/bar, running into his friend Pete, who is married to Charlie's ex-wife Sarabeth. Pete is very drunk, and decides to tag along with Charlie for as long as it takes to pass out. Charlie calls Vic from a pay phone, seeing the same red Sharpie limerick above the phone. He frantically tells Vic that Gelles is in town, but Vic dismisses this, as Gelles has family in Wichita.

Charlie returns to Sweet Cage and gives Renata the photo. She tells him that Vic had called to warn Charlie that Roy Gelles was indeed tailing them. Charlie takes Pete home only for Pete to vomit in Charlie's car and then pass out on the living room floor. Charlie then "borrows" a Mercedes Benz that Pete bought for Sarabeth, and goes to Vic's home. He finds Vic's wife next to their Christmas tree shot in the head. Vic arrives and reveals that he's locked Roy in a large trunk. They take Roy and Vic's wife in the Mercedes and drive to a local lake, while Roy continues yelling at them from the trunk, claiming that it was Vic who shot his wife. Vic gets annoyed and shoots the trunk, silencing him.

As Charlie and Vic get the trunk onto the lake dock, it's shot open from the inside by Gelles, with Vic being shot in the process. After Gelles gets out of the trunk a standoff ends with Roy dead and Vic falling into the frozen lake as the dock collapses. Charlie realizes that Vic was going to kill him, so he drags Vic's wife to the collapsed dock and slides her into the lake, knocking the pleading Vic underwater. When Charlie discovers the money isn't in Vic's bag, he runs back to the dock to save Vic, but he has already gone under in the freezing water, entwined with his dead wife.

Returning to Sweet Cage, Charlie finds that Guerrard himself has come to town, and has tied up Renata. A struggle ensues, ending with Guerrard's death. Charlie and Renata go back to her place, where he finds the money hidden in her closet while Renata showers. Via flashbacks, it is revealed that Vic and Renata planned to run away together after killing Charlie. Charlie shoots her before she can cut his throat with a hidden straight razor.

As Charlie is driving out of town with the money, he sees Sidney on the side of the road with his kids in a motor home, and Charlie stops to offer assistance. Sidney says that he is out of gas, so Charlie lets him syphon some out of the "borrowed" Mercedes. As Sidney is trying to restart the RV, Charlie takes out a red Sharpie and writes "As Wichita falls, so falls Wichita Falls" on the back of the motor home, revealing it was Charlie who had been writing the limerick all over town. Sidney gets the motor home started, and after accidentally knocking Charlie down when the RV lurches backwards, he drives away.

Charlie gets up and returns to the "borrowed" Mercedes. Pete wakes up in the back seat, and the duo drive away together for warmer weather.

Cast
John Cusack as Charlie Arglist
Billy Bob Thornton as Vincent 'Vic' Cavanaugh
Connie Nielsen as Renata Crest 
Randy Quaid as Bill Guerrard
Oliver Platt as Pete Van Heuten
Mike Starr as Roy Gelles
Ned Bellamy as Sidney
T.J. Jagodowski as Officer Tyler
David Pasquesi as Councilman Williams

Production
Frequent Harold Ramis collaborator Bill Murray was reportedly offered a role. Monica Bellucci was originally set to play the role of Renata, but had to leave due to her pregnancy. Ramis almost had to close production for a day due to the weather, which would have spoiled his tradition of never losing a shooting day.

Filming took place in the suburbs of Chicago.

Reception
The Ice Harvest opened in 1,550 theaters in North America and grossed $3.7 million, averaging $2,413 per theater and ranking 10th at the box office. The film ultimately earned $9 million in the US and $1.1 million internationally for a total of $10.2 million.

The film has a rating of 47% on Rotten Tomatoes based on 134 reviews and an average rating of 5.50/10. The consensus states: "The Ice Harvest offers a couple of laughs, but considering the people involved, it should be a lot funnier." On Metacritic, the film has a score of 62 out of 100 based on 32 reviews, indicating "generally favorable reviews".

James Berardinelli of Reelviews gave the film 2 and a half stars out of four, saying, "Despite its brevity, it seems padded, with all sorts of irrelevant scenes and dead-end subplots taking up time. [...] Next time, Ramis should work to his strengths, and film noir isn't one of them. The Ice Harvest will have melted away long before the turkey leftovers are polished off."

Roger Ebert gave the film 3 out of 4 stars and said: "I liked the movie for the quirky way it pursues humor through the drifts of greed, lust, booze, betrayal and spectacularly complicated ways to die. I liked it for Charlie's essential kindness, as when he pauses during a getaway to help a friend who has run out of gas. And for the scene-stealing pathos of Oliver Platt's drunk, who like many drunks in the legal profession achieves a rhetorical grandiosity during the final approach to oblivion. And I liked especially the way Roy, the man in the trunk, keeps on thinking positively, even after Vic puts bullets through both ends of the trunk because he can't remember which end of the trunk Roy's head is at. Maybe it's in the middle."

Home media 
The Ice Harvest was released on DVD on February 28, 2006 as part of the Focus Features Spotlight Series. The DVD extras consist of alternate endings, outtakes, and making-of featurettes.

See also
 List of Christmas films

References

External links
 
 
 
 
 

2005 films
2000s Christmas films
2000s buddy comedy films
American black comedy films
American crime comedy films
American Christmas films
American buddy comedy films
Films set in Kansas
Films shot in Illinois
Focus Features films
American neo-noir films
American crime comedy-drama films
Films directed by Harold Ramis
Films scored by David Kitay
Films with screenplays by Robert Benton
2000s English-language films
2000s American films
Films about alcoholism